The Series of 1928 was the first issue of small-size currency printed and released by the U.S. government.  These notes, first released to the public on July 10, 1929, were the first standardized notes in terms of design and characteristics, featuring similar portraits and other facets.  These notes were also the first to measure 6.313" by 2.688", smaller than the large-sized predecessors of Series 1923 and earlier that measured 7.438" by 3.141".

Federal Reserve Notes
Federal Reserve Notes featured a green Treasury Seal starting in 1928.  This was the only type of currency that, at first, featured the seal over the large engraved word to the right of the portrait.

These notes also carried a seal bearing the identity of the Federal Reserve Bank of issuance.  The bank was noted in the black, circular seal to the left of the portrait. This can be seen in the picture at the upper right, with a "7" in the seal. The Federal Reserve Bank of Chicago, responsible for the 7th district of the Federal Reserve System, issued this note. The regional seal is a design facet unique to Federal Reserve Notes, because almost all other types of notes were issued directly by the U.S. Treasury.

The 1928 Federal Reserve Notes were redeemable as per the following legend in the upper left corner of the note: Redeemable in gold on demand at the United States Treasury, or in gold or lawful money at any Federal Reserve Bank. While these notes were issued by the Federal Reserve Banks, they were still obligations of the U.S. Government, as stated: The United States of America will pay to the bearer on demand [so many] dollars. This obligation to exchange FRNs for gold ended in the early 1930s as the United States outlawed the private ownership of gold and left the gold standard in response to the Great Depression.

Design changes
The $5, $10, and $20 denominations were the first to be issued.

 Series of 1928A for $5, $10, and $20 resulted from a signature change, and corresponds to Series of 1928 for the $50 and $100 denominations.
 Series of 1928B for $5, $10, and $20; Series of 1928A for $50 and $100; and Series of 1928 for the large denominations reflected a change in the Federal Reserve Seal to contain a letter instead of a number.  The four corner numbers were aligned vertically, as well, causing a shift in plate position letters on certain denominations.
 Series of 1928C included only fives, tens, and twenties.  This series of notes saw very low printing figures as a result of the Great Depression, as only certain districts issued notes.  This series, the result of a signature change, is also known for its specific light green Treasury Seal variety.
 Series of 1928D, also the result of a signature change, included only fives, and all notes were issued by the Federal Reserve Bank of Atlanta.  These notes are among the rarest small-size notes in existence today.

Series of 1928 Federal Reserve Note denomination set
All banknotes in the following table are Series of 1928 Federal Reserve Notes from the National Numismatic Collection at the National Museum of American History (Smithsonian Institution).

United States (Legal Tender) Notes
Series of 1928 United States Notes were issued in $2 (through 1928G) and $5 (through 1928F) denominations until the early 1950s.  Also, for a brief period in 1933, Series of 1928 $1 United States Notes were issued as a response to the Great Depression.  Most of these remained in storage before being released in Puerto Rico during 1948-9.

Series of 1928 United States Note denomination set

Silver Certificates and Gold Certificates
Series of 1928 through 1928E silver certificates were only issued in the $1 denomination.  The design closely followed the 1923 $1 Silver Certificate.

1928 saw the last issuance of Gold Certificates to the public prior to their confiscation during the Great Depression.

Series of 1928 Gold Certificate denomination set

Gallery

References

External links
Bureau of Engraving and Printing
Six Kinds of United States Paper Currency
History of Currency Designs
Series of 1928 and 1934 Federal Reserve Note Seal Colors
Series of 1928 and 1934 Gold Certificates

Paper money of the United States